Eugenio Dugoni (24 March 1907 – 24 August 1960) was an Italian politician who served as member of the Constituent Assembly (1946–1948), Deputy (1948–1958) and Mayor of Mantua (1956–1960).

References

1907 births
1960 deaths
Mayors of Mantua
Deputies of Legislature I of Italy
Deputies of Legislature II of Italy
20th-century Italian politicians
Italian Socialist Party politicians